Alabama's 2nd congressional district is a United States congressional district in Alabama, which elects a representative to the United States House of Representatives. It includes most of the Montgomery metropolitan area, and stretches into the Wiregrass Region in the southeastern portion of the state.  The district encompasses portions of Montgomery County and the entirety of Autauga, Barbour, Bullock, Butler, Coffee, Conecuh, Covington, Crenshaw, Dale, Elmore, Geneva, Henry, Houston and Pike counties. Other cities in the district include Andalusia, Dothan,  Greenville, and Troy.

The district is represented by Republican Barry Moore, a former Alabama state representative, who replaced Martha Roby, the retired Republican incumbent, in the 2020 election.

Character

There are several small-to-medium-sized cities spread throughout the district. Fort Rucker and Maxwell-Gunter Air Force Base are both within its bounds, as is Troy University.

White voters here were among the first in Alabama to shift from the Democratic Party; the old-line Southern Democrats in this area began splitting their tickets as early as the 1950s. Today, the district is one of the most Republican districts in both Alabama and the nation. It has only supported a Democrat for president once since 1956, when Jimmy Carter carried it in 1976.  In 2008, the district elected a Democrat to Congress for the first time since 1964, but it reverted to its Republican ways in 2010.  At the state and local level, however, conservative Democrats continued to hold most offices as late as 2002.

White voters gave John McCain, the Republican candidate, 63.42% of the vote in 2008; Barack Obama, the Democratic candidate, received 36.05%, attracting voters beyond the substantial (and expected) African-American minority.

The district gives its congressmen very long tenures in Washington; only seven people have represented it since 1923, with all but one holding it for at least 10 years and four holding it for at least 15 years.

Recent election results from statewide races

List of members representing the district

Recent election results
These are the results from the previous ten election cycles in Alabama's 2nd district.

2002

2004

2006

2008

2010

2012

2014

2016

2018

2020

2022

See also

Alabama's congressional districts
List of United States congressional districts

References
Specific

General
 
 
 Congressional Biographical Directory of the United States 1774–present
 A New Nation Votes

External links
CNN coverage of the 2008 election
CNN coverage of the 2006 election
CNN coverage of the 2004 election
CNN coverage of the 2002 election
CNN coverage of the 2000 election

02
Autauga County, Alabama
Barbour County, Alabama
Bullock County, Alabama
Butler County, Alabama
Coffee County, Alabama
Conecuh County, Alabama
Covington County, Alabama
Crenshaw County, Alabama
Dale County, Alabama
Elmore County, Alabama
Geneva County, Alabama
Henry County, Alabama
Houston County, Alabama
Lowndes County, Alabama
Montgomery County, Alabama
Constituencies established in 1823
1823 establishments in Alabama
Constituencies disestablished in 1841
1841 disestablishments in Alabama
Constituencies established in 1843
1843 establishments in Alabama
Constituencies disestablished in 1861
1861 disestablishments in Alabama
Constituencies established in 1868
1868 establishments in Alabama
Constituencies disestablished in 1963
1963 disestablishments in Alabama
Constituencies established in 1965
1965 establishments in Alabama